Marcos Emiliano Pirchio (January 25, 1986) is an Argentine footballer who plays for Royal Pari of the Bolivian Primera División in Bolivia. He plays as a striker or a deep lying centre forward.

Career

Pirchio hails from Casilda, hometown of another Estudiantes great, Marcelo Trobbiani. He made his top flight debut on May 7, 2006 against Gimnasia de La Plata. On September 5, 2007 Pirchio scored his first competitive goal for Estudiantes in a Copa Sudamericana fixture against Club Atlético Lanús.

In 2008, he transferred to Olimpo de Bahía Blanca, where he played until July 2009. Subsequently he moved to Ecuador and signed for Deportivo Quito. He returned to Argentina subsequently, joining second division side Unión de Santa Fe.

External links
  
 Statistics at BDFA 
 
 

1986 births
Living people
People from Casilda
Sportspeople from Santa Fe Province
Argentine footballers
Association football forwards
Argentine Primera División players
Primera Nacional players
Ecuadorian Serie A players
Estudiantes de La Plata footballers
Olimpo footballers
S.D. Quito footballers
Unión de Santa Fe footballers
Everton de Viña del Mar footballers
Colorado Rapids players
C.S.D. Macará footballers
All Boys footballers
C.D. Jorge Wilstermann players
Expatriate footballers in Chile
Expatriate footballers in Ecuador
Expatriate footballers in Vietnam
Expatriate footballers in Bolivia
Expatriate footballers in Peru
Expatriate soccer players in the United States
Argentine expatriate sportspeople in Chile
Argentine expatriate sportspeople in Ecuador
Argentine expatriate sportspeople in Vietnam
Argentine expatriate sportspeople in Bolivia
Argentine expatriate sportspeople in Peru
Argentine expatriate sportspeople in the United States